Michael Gungor (born September 14, 1980) also known as Vishnu Dass is an American singer-songwriter, producer, music editor, author, and podcast host. He led the musical collective Gungor, which received multiple Grammy nominations. The group's music has been compared to that of Sufjan Stevens, Bon Iver, and Arcade Fire. Aside from his work with the band, Gungor has written and produced music for several other artists, and is a co-founder of the art collective The Liturgists.

Music career

Early career
As early as 2002, Gungor began producing albums with his church, Resurrection Life Church, in Grandville, Michigan. The albums garnered the attention of Integrity music, who signed Gungor for a solo album. In 2003, he released "Bigger Than My Imagination" under Integrity Media. The album included the single "Friend of God", a Dove Award-nominated song that Gungor wrote with Gospel artist Israel Houghton. The album also enjoyed some radio play.

In 2005, Gungor toured with Teen Mania's Acquire the Fire traveling youth rally event. That same year, he and his wife Lisa released a live album titled Battle Cry: Worship from the Frontlines, through Integrity Media. Gungor would later retire most of the songs on this album, tweeting a link to his blog that can no longer be located. The blog stated that Gungor no longer preferred to associate military imagery with Christian belief.

The Michael Gungor Band
In 2006, Gungor parted ways with Integrity Music, seeking more creative control over his music. He then formed the Michael Gungor Band, consisting of himself on guitar and vocals, his wife Lisa on vocals, his brother David Gungor on bass, John Arndt on piano, Josh Eatmon on drums, and former Desperation Band member Michael Rossback as a guitarist and producer.

Gungor rented a house down the road from his church in Grandville and turned it into a recording studio. It was there that Gungor and Rossback produced their 2007 release, All I Need is Here. This was Gungor's first independent project, and was a great departure from the predictable CCM box of his two releases with Integrity.

In 2008, the Michael Gungor Band signed with Brash Records.  The label re-released their album in 2008 as Ancient Skies, omitting two songs and adding the upbeat rock opener "Say So", as well as a song sung by Lisa, "You Are The Light".

Gungor 

After touring with his sophomore release, Michael Gungor renamed the group from "The Michael Gungor Band" to simply "Gungor" (styled as güngör). This reflected another change, both in the direction of his music and in the evolving number of band members. The first album release under the new name was Beautiful Things in 2010. This album was yet another departure from Gungor's old style, involving indie-folk instrumentation reminiscent of Sufjan Stevens, and ambient soundscapes. The album featured a short gospel-blues jam featuring Israel Houghton titled "Heaven". In 2011, the album and its title track, "Beautiful Things", were nominated for the Grammy categories Best Rock or Rap Gospel Album and Best Gospel Song, respectively.

In 2011, Gungor released Ghosts Upon the Earth, and followed this with a live album, A Creation Liturgy in 2012. The band's third studio album, I Am Mountain, was released on September 24, 2013. On October 24, 2013, the band began its 60-city headline tour across the U.S., Canada, Australia, New Zealand, and Europe.

Though Gungor's music is filled with Christian themes and language and is spiritual in nature, the collective has attempted to distance itself from being labeled simply a "Christian" band due to the problematic way the term is often used. Michael Gungor refers to Gungor as a collective because at any given time the group is composed of 3–10 members. He and his wife believe that their music transcends any one genre. Gungor writes songs that are a mix of indie rock, post rock, prog, soft rock and more. When asked, Gungor describes his style as "alternative, folk, textured and experimental." They performed at SXSW 2014.

Gungor announced the end of their journey as a band in early 2019. The "End of the World" tour became their farewell tour.

The Liturgists 
In 2014, Gungor, together with Michael's wife and sister, began collaborating with other artists and releasing music as "The Liturgists", which he calls "an experimental art collective". This is also the title of their podcast, which discusses topics through the lenses of science, art and faith.

Writing 
Gungor published his first book The Crowd, the Critic and the Muse in 2012.

In April 2019, Gungor published his second book This. He is currently the host to a podcast, which shares the name with the book, that explores the spiritual themes of clinging and suffering.

Personal life 

Michael Gungor grew up in Marshfield, Wisconsin. He is the son of pastor and author Ed Gungor. He began writing and playing music at a young age and went on to study jazz guitar at both Western Michigan University and the University of North Texas while also touring and working as a multi-instrumentalist musician. He met his wife Lisa at Oral Roberts University during their first year, and she, also a musician, later became his music partner and serves as the other primary vocalist and songwriter for Gungor.

Michael and Lisa live in Los Angeles, California with their two daughters, Amelie and Lucette. They wrote the song "Light" for their younger daughter, born in May 2014, who has Down syndrome.

In 2007, Michael and Lisa Gungor founded a non-denominational church community called Bloom, but have since dissociated themselves from the church.

Discography

Michael Gungor
Bigger Than My Imagination (November 11, 2003)
Battle Cry: Worship from the Frontlines (October 4, 2005)

Michael Gungor Band
Ancient Skies EP (March 24, 2006)
All I Need Is Here (October 9, 2007)
Ancient Skies (September 9, 2008)

Gungor
Beautiful Things (February 16, 2010)
Ghosts Upon the Earth (September 20, 2011)
A Creation Liturgy (October 9, 2012)
I Am Mountain (September 24, 2013)
One Wild Life: Soul (August 7, 2015)
O Christmas EP  (November 27, 2015)
One Wild Life: Spirit (March 25, 2016)
One Wild Life: Body (September 30, 2016)

The Liturgists
Vapor EP (February 28, 2014)
Garden EP (April 8, 2014)
God Our Mother EP (May 6, 2014)
Pentecost EP (June 6, 2014)
Oh Light (December 20, 2015)
Holy Week (March 2016)

Awards
 GMA Dove Awards 2008: "Say So" – Contemporary Gospel Recorded Song of the Year
 Independent Music Awards 2013: A Creation Liturgy (Live) – Best Live Performance Album

Publications
 The Crowd, the Critic, and the Muse: A Book for Creators – (2012)
 This: Becoming Free – (2019)

References

External links 
 

Living people
Oral Roberts University alumni
Western Michigan University alumni
University of North Texas College of Music alumni
1980 births
American spiritual writers